Azerbaijan participated in the Turkvision Song Contest 2015 which took place in Istanbul, Turkey. Azad Azerbaijan TV (ATV) was responsible for organising their entry for the contest. Mehman Tağıyev won the national final, Azerbaycan`ın Sesi, on 29 September, earning the right to represent Azerbaijan in the contest. On 8 October, his song, "Istanbul" was internally selected. Azerbaijan placed 7th with 155 points.

Background

Prior to the 2015 contest, Azerbaijan had participated in the Junior Eurovision Song Contest twice since its first entry in 2013, winning the contest in 2013 with the song "Yaşa" performed by Farid Hasanov. In 2014, Elvin Ordubadli represented the nation with the song "Divlerin Yalqizliği", placing ninth with 177 points. The Azerbaijani broadcaster, Azad Azerbaijan TV (ATV), broadcasts the event within Azerbaijan and organizes the selection process for the nation's entry. ATV confirmed their intentions to participate at the 2015 Turkvision Song Contest on 13 April 2015. Azerbaijan has selected their entries for the Turkvision Song Contest through national finals in the past.

Before Turkvision

Selection process

On 13 April 2015, it was announced that the artist would be selected through a selection process titled Azerbaycan`ın Sesi as had been done the year before. This was broadcast weekly on Tuesdays from June to September, with the final taking place on 29 September 2015. Four participants contested for the right to represent Azerbaijan in the Turkvision Song Contest 2015, which was eventually won by Mehman Tağıyev. On 8 October 2015, it was revealed that the song Tağıyev would sing was titled "İstanbul".

Artist and song information

Mehman Tağıyev

Mehman Tağıyev (born 25 June 1990) is an Azerbaijani singer and musician notable for representing Azerbaijan in the 2015 Turkvision Song Contest. In 2015, Tağıyev won Azerbaycan`ın Sesi, earning the right to represent Azerbaijan in the Turkvision Song Contest. Tağıyev placed seventh with 155 points.

Tağıyev participated in the sixth season of O Ses Türkiye (Voice of Turkey). During the blind auditions, Tağıyev sang "Sari Gelin", with all four judges expressing interest to work with Tağıyev. Tağıyev selected Sibel Can to be his mentor for the remainder of the competition. Tağıyev was then paired with another of Sibel Can's artists, Pervaz İbrahimli, to compete against each other. Tağıyev performed the song "Ay Gız" and was selected by Sibel Can to proceed to the next round over İbrahimli. Tağıyev continued to the duelling stage where he was once again paired with another of Sibel Can's artists, Hüsnü Sarmış. They performed the song "Aman Aman" and Tağıyev was selected by Sibel Can to proceed to the next stage. Tağıyev performed the song "Yalgızam" while competing against another artist, Yelena Şelkunova, and was eliminated when receiving only 48% of audience's vote.

Besides singing, Tağıyev is able to play the guitar and piano and has worked with the Nakhichevan State Philharmonic Society.

İstanbul
"İstanbul" ( is a song composed by Elza Seyidcahan with lyrics written by Ganira Pashayeva, and was performed by Azerbaijani singer Mehman Tağıyev at the Turkvision Song Contest 2015.

At Turkvision 
Unlike previous years, the Turkvision Song Contest 2015 had no semi-final. The final was scheduled to take place on 19 December 2015.

Final 
On 18 December 2015, Azerbaijan took part in a single dress rehearsal for the final. Azerbaijan performed third out of the twenty-one countries and areas participating in the final, following Albania and preceding Belarus. Tağıyev was joined on stage by dancers and a musician. Tağıyev placed seventh in the final with 155 points. The final was broadcast in Azerbaijan on ATV.

Voting 
Despite discussions taking place regarding the introduction of a televote, it was announced on 31 August 2015 that no televote would be used in the contest. Voting for the Turkvision Song Contest 2015 was determined by a single juror from each country. The juror gave each country a number of points from 1 to 10, depending on the quality of the song.

See also 
 Azerbaijan in the Eurovision Song Contest 2015
 Azerbaijan in the Turkvision Song Contest
 Turkvision Song Contest 2015

References

External links 
 Official ATV website

Turkvision
2015
Countries in the Turkvision Song Contest 2015